The Queen of Sheba was a monarch of the ancient kingdom of Sheba.

Queen of Sheba may also refer to:

Arts and entertainment
 The Queen of Sheba (1921 film), an American silent film directed by J. Gordon Edwards
 The Queen of Sheba (1952 film), an Italian film directed by Pietro Francisci
 "The Queen of Sheba", a 2006 special of British sitcom The Royle Family
 Queen of Sheba (sculpture), a public artwork by Alexander Archipenko in Milwaukee, Wisconsin, US
 La reine de Saba, an 1862 opera by Charles Gounod 
 Die Königin von Saba, an 1875 opera by Karl Goldmark
 The Arrival of the Queen of Sheba, an instrumental sinfonia from Handel's Solomon

Other
 Queen of Sheba (restaurant), an Ethiopian restaurant in Portland, Oregon
 Thelymitra variegata, a rare orchid from Western Australia
 Queen Sheba III, Sheba Debra Amelia Kasambu'Ra, empress and traditional queen ruler in Africa currently living in Democratic Republic of Congo

See also
 Queen of Sheba's Palace (disambiguation)
 
 Solomon and Sheba, a 1959 film starring Gina Lollobrigida as the Queen of Sheba
 Solomon & Sheba (1995 film), starring Halle Berry as the Queen of Sheba